Natalia Mardero (Montevideo, 22 September 1975) is a Uruguayan writer and journalist.

Works 
 2001, Posmonauta (ed. Latina; Irrupciones 2010)
 2004, Guía para un universo
 2012, Gato en el ropero y otros haikus
 2014, Cordón Soho 
 2019, Escrito en Super 8

References

1975 births
Living people
People from Montevideo
Uruguayan journalists
Uruguayan women journalists
Uruguayan women writers